The 2020–21 Tunisian Ligue Professionnelle 1 (Tunisian Professional League) season was the 95th season of top-tier football in Tunisia. Espérance Tunis were the champions, winning the title for the fifth consecutive season and the 31st time in their history (a national record).

Teams
A total of 14 teams contested the league.

Stadiums and locations

Personnel and kits

Managerial changes

Foreign players

League table

Results

Positions by round

Clubs season-progress

Season statistics

Goals scored per round
This graph represents the number of goals scored during each round:

Top scorers

Number of teams by Governorate

Awards 
Each month Internet users vote for the player of the month sponsored by Foot24 and Coca-Cola.

Monthly

Media coverage

See also
2020–21 Tunisian Ligue Professionnelle 2
2020–21 Tunisian Cup

References

External links
 Fédération Tunisienne de Football

Tunisian Ligue Professionnelle 1 seasons
Tunisia
1